The 2nd Legislative Assembly of Saskatchewan was elected in the Saskatchewan general election held in August 1908. The assembly sat from December 10, 1908, to June 15, 1912. The Liberal Party led by Walter Scott formed the government. The Provincial Rights Party led by Frederick Haultain formed the official opposition.

William Charles Sutherland served as speaker for the assembly.

Members of the Assembly 
The following members were elected to the assembly in 1908:

Notes:

Party Standings 

Notes:

By-elections 
By-elections were held to replace members for various reasons:

Notes:

References 

Terms of the Saskatchewan Legislature